Sawdust Caesar: The Untold History of Mussolini and Fascism is a 1935 biography of Benito Mussolini and a history of the rise of Fascism in Italy by American investigative journalist George Seldes.

Reviews
A 1936 review in American Political Science Review stated: "Here, as the title indicates, is a piece of sensational journalism rather than of scientific analysis. Such a remark, however, is not meant in condemnation; for there is a considerable measure of usefulness in Seldes' contribution, considering all the extraordinary circumstances."

References

External links
 

1935 non-fiction books
Benito Mussolini
Books about fascism
English-language books
History books about Italy